John Olav Larssen (7 March 1927 – 2 January 2009) was a Norwegian evangelical preacher and missionary.

He was born in Hellvik, and settled in Bryne. He started as a preacher at the age of eighteen, and eventually began touring Norway. He has been nicknamed "Norway's Billy Graham". Books written by Larssen include En åpen dør (1957), Elsket av Gud (1961), Fra høvelbenk til misjonsmark (1964), Kraft fra det høye (1968), and Gud vil vekkelse (1970).

References

1927 births
2009 deaths
People from Eigersund
People from Bryne
Norwegian Protestant missionaries
Norwegian evangelists
Norwegian evangelicals
Protestant missionaries in Norway